Race to Red is an album released by alternative rock band Darling Thieves (formerly known as I Hate Kate). This is the second release by the band, following their first album entitled Embrace the Curse. This is the band's first album released under their new name. It was released on June 17, 2010. as a digital album only. It is only available on digital stores such as iTunes or Amazon.com and others.

Track listing

Personnel
 Justin Mauriello– guitar, vocals
 Scott Hayden-bass guitar
 AJ Condosta– drums

References

External links
 Melodic Net album review
 Race to Red on Myspace

2010 albums
Darling Thieves albums
Glassnote Records albums